The New India Assurance Co. Ltd., is an Indian central public sector undertaking under the ownership of Ministry of Finance, Government of India. It is a government-owned-general insurer based in Mumbai. It is the largest nationalised general insurance company of India on the basis of gross premium collection inclusive of foreign operations. It was founded by Sir Dorabji Tata in 1919, and was nationalised in 1973.

Previously, it was a subsidiary of the General Insurance Corporation of India (GIC). But when GIC became a re-insurance company following the passage of the IRDA Act 1999, its four primary insurance subsidiaries New India Assurance, United India Insurance, Oriental Insurance and National Insurance became autonomous.

Offices

The company, with its registered Head office in Mumbai, has about 31 regional offices, 6 Large Corporate Offices, 447 Divisional Offices, 578 Branches, 27 Direct Agent Branches and 1,239 Micro Offices, Elmo Auto hub, 2 centralised legal hubs totaling 2329 offices.

The company operates in 28 countries as of 2015-16. The foreign operations details are as follows:

Workforce

The company's achievements include:

 Market leadership position for four consecutive decades.
 The ratio of available solvency margin to required solvency margin standing at 2.3 times(Global).
 Total net worth of ₹28,895 crores.
 Total assets - crossed ₹61720 crores.
 Only Indian General Insurance Company to have presence in 28 countries.

Rating 
NIA is the only direct insurer in India rated A-(Excellent – Positive outlook) by AM Best. CRISIL reaffirmed its AAA/STABLE rating, indicating that the company has the highest degree of financial strength.

References

External links
 

General insurance companies of India
Financial services companies based in Mumbai
Financial services companies established in 1919
Government-owned insurance companies of India
Companies nationalised by the Government of India
Indian companies established in 1919
Companies listed on the National Stock Exchange of India
Companies listed on the Bombay Stock Exchange